Vikos may refer to:

 Vikos, Ioannina, village in the Central Zagori municipal unit in Ioannina regional unit, Greece
 Vikos Gorge, gorge in the Pindus Mountains of north-western Greece
 Vikos doctors, folk healers or practical medical practitioners from the Greek area of Zagori
 Vikos–Aoös National Park, national park in the region of Epirus in northwestern Greece
 Vikos-Aoos Geopark, national park in mainland Greece